Simone Ciancio (born 18 July 1987) is an Italian professional footballer who plays as a defender for  club Novara.

Club career
On 2 August 2019, he joined Carrarese.

On 28 August 2020, he signed a one-year contract with Avellino.

On 18 July 2022, Ciancio moved to Novara.

References

External links
 

1987 births
Living people
Sportspeople from the Province of Verona
Footballers from Veneto
Italian footballers
Association football defenders
Serie B players
Serie C players
U.C. Sampdoria players
A.S. Pizzighettone players
U.S. Alessandria Calcio 1912 players
A.S. Cittadella players
S.S. Juve Stabia players
Cosenza Calcio players
U.S. Lecce players
Catania S.S.D. players
Carrarese Calcio players
U.S. Avellino 1912 players
Novara F.C. players